Clann Mhuire is a Gaelic Athletic Association club based at Naul, County Dublin, Ireland, serving Naul and its surrounding areas.

The club fields teams from U-8 to U-18 for both boys and girls. At adult level, the club has two football teams competing in Dublin AFL Div. 4 and AFL11 North County and the Dublin Intermediate Football Championship and one ladies football team in Division 2.

The Ladies won the Junior A championship in 2014.

Achievements
 Dublin Junior Football Championship Winners 1994
 Dublin AFL Div. 4 Winners 2015

References

External links
 

Gaelic games clubs in Fingal
Gaelic football clubs in Fingal